XHIPM-FM is a noncommercial radio station on 102.3 FM in Mérida, Yucatán. It is owned by Instituto para la Protección del Medio Natural, A.C. (Institute for the Protection of the Natural Environment) and is known as Radio Ecológica.

History
XHIPM was permitted on August 16, 1999 and came to air at 11am on February 11, 2000. Its operator is a civil society organization founded in 1993.

References

Radio stations in Yucatán
Radio stations established in 2000